A constitutional referendum was held in Morocco on 30 May 1980. The referendum asked whether voters approved of changes to articles 43 (elections and term) and 95 (local assemblies) of the 1972 constitution, which would extend the mandate of Parliament from four to six years. The changes were approved by 96.7% of voters, with a 90.8% turnout.

Results

References

1980 referendums
Referendums in Morocco
1980 in Morocco
Constitutional referendums in Morocco